Neoamphitrite is a genus of polychaetes belonging to the family Terebellidae.

The genus has almost cosmopolitan distribution.

Species:

Neoamphitrite affinis 
Neoamphitrite edwardsii 
Neoamphitrite figulus 
Neoamphitrite glasbyi 
Neoamphitrite grayi 
Neoamphitrite groenlandica 
Neoamphitrite hydrothermalis 
Neoamphitrite pachyderma 
Neoamphitrite ramosissima 
Neoamphitrite robusta 
Neoamphitrite sibogae 
Neoamphitrite undevigintipes 
Neoamphitrite vigintipes

References

Polychaetes